Verruca is a genus of asymmetrical sessile barnacles in the family Verrucidae. There are about 20 described species in Verruca, around half of them extinct.

Species
These species belong to the genus Verruca:

 Verruca cookei Pilsbry, 1928
 Verruca gibbosa Hoek, 1883
 Verruca jago Buckeridge, 1997
 Verruca laevigata (Sowerby, 1827)
 Verruca minuta Young, 2000
 Verruca mitra Hoek, 1907
 Verruca scrippsae Zullo, 1964
 Verruca sewelli Stubbings, 1936
 Verruca spengleri Darwin, 1854
 Verruca stroemia (O.F. Müller, 1776) (wart barnacle)
 Verruca vertica
 † Verruca alaskana Pilsbry, 1943
 † Verruca gailgoedertae Perreault & Buckeridge, 2019
 † Verruca koikei Tanaka et al. in Koike et al., 2006
 † Verruca prisca Bosquet, 1854
 † Verruca punica Buckeridge & Jagt, 2008
 † Verruca pusilla Bosquet, 1857
 † Verruca sorrellae Perreault & Buckeridge, 2019
 † Verruca steenstrupi Brünnich Nielsen, 1912
 † Verruca tasmanica Buckeridge, 1983
 † Verruca veneta Carriol & Diemi, 2005
 † Verruca withersi Kruizinga, 1939

References

External links

 

Barnacles